Watiwa is a Rai Coast language of Papua New Guinea.

It is spoken by some 500 people living in six villages in Madang Province, Papua New Guinea, including Bebei and Dumpu villages of Usino Rural LLG.

It is more commonly known as Dumpu, but this is the name of one of the six villages, and is not accepted as a name for the language. Surviving mostly as a secret language with which to talk amongst themselves when outsiders are present, the majority of the speakers use Tok Pisin in daily life. Due to its increasingly rare use, it is estimated that this language will be extinct in a few decades.

References

Rai Coast languages
Languages of Madang Province
Endangered Papuan languages